The Brewster Building (also known as Galt Mercantile or the Sawyer Building) is a historic commercial building and IOOF Hall located at 201 Fourth Street in Galt, California.  It was built in 1882 and was listed on the National Register of Historic Places in 2000.

It is a two-story, Italianate style commercial building with a brick veneer exterior. Its first floor and basement were originally occupied by John Brewster & Co.;  a Masonic Hall and offices used the second floor. It served a Masonic lodge at first, and later served an Odd Fellows lodge.

See also
Independent Order of Odd Fellows
National Register of Historic Places listings in Sacramento County, California
California Historical Landmarks in Sacramento County, California

References

Odd Fellows buildings in California
Masonic buildings in California
Buildings and structures in Sacramento County, California
National Register of Historic Places in Sacramento County, California
Commercial buildings on the National Register of Historic Places in California
Commercial buildings completed in 1882
Italianate architecture in California